Texas's 36th congressional district is a district that was created as a result of the 2010 Census. The first candidates ran in the 2012 House elections for a seat in the 113th United States Congress. Steve Stockman won the general election, and represented the new district.  On December 9, 2013, Stockman announced that he would not seek reelection in 2014, and would instead challenge incumbent John Cornyn in the Republican senatorial primary, and was succeeded in the U.S. House by Brian Babin.

Texas's 36th congressional district is located in southeast Texas and includes all of Chambers, Hardin, Jasper, Liberty, Newton, and Tyler counties, plus portions of southeastern Harris County and northwestern Jefferson County. The Johnson Space Center is within the district. The 36th district is one of only two districts in Texas (the other being the 31st district) that has never been represented by a member of the Democratic Party.

Election results from presidential races

List of members representing the district

Election results 

The first iteration of the district included portions of four previous congressional districts that were represented by:
 Kevin Brady: Newton, Jasper, Tyler, Polk, Orange, Hardin Counties and a portion of Liberty County
 Ted Poe: the other portion of Liberty County and a portion of northeast Harris County
 Ron Paul: Chambers County
 Gene Green: a portion of east Harris County
 Pete Olson: a portion of southeast Harris County

In 2012, there were twelve candidates for the Republican nomination, one candidate for the Democratic nomination, one Libertarian candidate and one independent candidate.

Candidates in the 2014 primary included Republicans Phil Fitzgerald, John Amdur, Doug Centilli, Dave Norman, Chuck Meyer and Kim I. Morrell, and Democrat Michael K. Cole.

References

External links

36
Constituencies established in 2013
2013 establishments in Texas
Harris County, Texas